Senotainia vigilans is a species of satellite flies (insects in the family Sarcophagidae).

References

Sarcophagidae
Articles created by Qbugbot
Insects described in 1924
Diptera of North America